Jack of Diamonds is a 2012 novel by Australian author Bryce Courtenay.

It is Courtenay's final novel, finished shortly before his death from stomach cancer.

References

External links
 Jack of Diamonds at Penguin Books, Australia

2012 Australian novels
Novels by Bryce Courtenay
Viking Press books